Mian Rud (also Romanized as Mīān Rūd) is a village in Feyziyeh Rural District, in the Central District of Babol County, Mazandaran Province, Iran. At the 2006 census, its population was 206, in 49 families.

References 

Populated places in Babol County